Utaki (御嶽) is an Okinawan term for a sacred place, often a grove, cave, or mountain. They are central to the Ryukyuan religion and the former noro priestess system.  Although the term utaki is used throughout the Ryukyu Islands, the terms suku and on are heard in the Miyako and Yaeyama regions respectively.  Utaki are usually located on the outskirts of villages and are places for the veneration of gods and ancestors.  Most gusuku have places of worship, and it is theorized that the origins of both gusuku and utaki are closely related.

Important Utaki
 Biinudaki (弁ヶ嶽), Naha
 Misaki-on (美崎御嶽), Ishigaki
 Miyatori-on (宮鳥御嶽), Nago
 Pyarumizu-utaki (漲水御嶽), Miyako
 Sefa-utaki (斎場御嶽), Nanjō
 Sunuhyan-utaki (園比屋武御嶽), Naha
 Tohaya-uganju (渡波屋拝所), Nago
 Tsunoji-utaki (ツノジ御嶽), Miyako
 Upugusuku-utaki (大城御嶽), Miyako

Ryukyu Islands
Religious buildings and structures in Okinawa Prefecture
Sacred groves